Ryan Cook (born 16 February 1988) is an Australian rules footballer who played for the Collingwood Football Club in the Australian Football League (AFL) between 2006 and 2010.

He is a lively midfielder/half-forward who kicked three goals and had 19 disposals to be one of the Dandenong Stingrays' best in their losing TAC Cup Grand Final against Gippsland Power. The Magpies' fourth pick at 23 in the 2005 AFL Draft, Cook was touted as a fast player with great endurance, as evidenced by a 13.7 beep test result.

His step brother is Nick Malceski who plays for Sydney Swans.

He was delisted by Collingwood at the end of the 2010 season. He then moved to Western Australia to play for South Fremantle Football Club in the West Australian Football League.  He won South Fremantle's best and fairest award, the W. J. Hughes Medal, for the 2011 season.

References

External links

WAFL profile

1988 births
Living people
Collingwood Football Club players
Australian rules footballers from Victoria (Australia)
Dandenong Stingrays players
South Fremantle Football Club players